Bhoranj is a tehsil in the Hamirpur district of Himachal Pradesh, located in northern India.

Language

The people of Bhoranj speak Pahari (Hamirpuri), which has lots of similarities with Kahluri and Mandeali.  Hindi and English are both officially recognized as local languages as well.

Demographics

The total population of the Bhoranj tehsil is 81,986 – 38,456 males and 43,530 females.

Climate

The average temperature in the summer is between 15 and 31 °C. During the winter, temperatures can drop as low as 2 °C in the winter and go as high as 38 °C in the summer. Monsoon season starts in July. By October, nights and mornings are very cold. Snowfall at elevations of nearly 3000 m is about 3 m and persists from early December to late March. At about 4500 m the snow lasts year round.

References

Cities and towns in Hamirpur district, Himachal Pradesh